Robert Zepp (born September 7, 1981) is a Canadian-born German former professional ice hockey goaltender who played in the National Hockey League (NHL). Zepp spent most of his playing career in Europe, playing two seasons in the Finnish SM-liiga for SaiPa and seven seasons in the Deutsche Eishockey Liga for Eisbären Berlin. During his final season, he played 10 NHL games with the Philadelphia Flyers.

Playing career
Born in Newmarket, Ontario, Zepp played junior hockey for the Plymouth Whalers in the Ontario Hockey League (OHL). During three standout years with the high-flying Whalers, Zepp was awarded the Dave Pinkney Trophy three years running as a part of the goaltending duo in OHL with the lowest goals against average (GAA). In his first season with the Whalers, Zepp was also awarded the Bobby Smith Trophy as the OHL Scholastic Player of the Year who best combines high standards of play and academic excellence and the CHL Scholastic Player of the Year Award.

Zepp was drafted by the Atlanta Thrashers in the fourth round, 99th overall, in the 1999 NHL Entry Draft. He never signed a contract with the Thrashers and was drafted by the Carolina Hurricanes in round 4, 110th overall in the 2001 NHL Entry Draft. He played from 2001 until 2005 with the Florida Everblades of the East Coast Hockey League (ECHL) before deciding to play in Europe, joining SaiPa of the Finnish SM-liiga, where he played two seasons. He then joined Eisbären Berlin in 2007.

On July 1, 2014, Zepp returned to North America by signing a one-year, two-way contract with the Philadelphia Flyers. On December 21, Zepp made his NHL debut against the Winnipeg Jets at the age of 33. Wearing jersey number 72, he made 25 saves out of 28 shots on goal to lead the Flyers to a 4–3 overtime victory.

Career statistics

Regular season

International

Awards and honours

References

External links

 

1981 births
Atlanta Thrashers draft picks
Canadian ice hockey goaltenders
Carolina Hurricanes draft picks
Eisbären Berlin players
Florida Everblades players
German ice hockey players
Lehigh Valley Phantoms players
Living people
Lowell Lock Monsters players
Sportspeople from Newmarket, Ontario
Philadelphia Flyers players
Plymouth Whalers players
SaiPa players
SaPKo players
Canadian expatriate ice hockey players in Finland
Canadian expatriate ice hockey players in Germany